Events from the year 1755 in Scotland.

Incumbents

Law officers 
 Lord Advocate – Robert Dundas the younger
 Solicitor General for Scotland – Patrick Haldane of Gleneagles, jointly with Alexander Hume; then Andrew Pringle of Alemore

Judiciary 
 Lord President of the Court of Session – Lord Glendoick
 Lord Justice General – Lord Ilay
 Lord Justice Clerk – Lord Tinwald

Events 
 June – Joseph Black's discovery of carbon dioxide and magnesium is communicated in a paper to the Philosophical Society of Edinburgh.
 1 November – Lisbon earthquake felt in Scotland.
 Demographic history of Scotland: First reliable national census conducted by Rev. Alexander Webster, showing the country's population as 1,265,380. Four towns have populations of over 10,000, with Edinburgh the largest with 57,000 inhabitants.
 Construction of St Ninian's Church, Tynet, the country's oldest surviving post-Reformation Roman Catholic clandestine church.
 Ironworks established at Furnace, Argyll.
 Work on William Roy's survey of Scotland concludes.

Births 
 18 January – James Hamilton, 7th Duke of Hamilton (died 1769)
 21 February – Anne Grant, poet (died 1838)
 25 June – Archibald Gracie merchant and shipowner (died 1829 in the United States)
 August 5 – James Playfair, Scottish Neoclassical architect (died 1794)
 17 August – William Paterson, soldier, colonial governor in Australia, explorer and botanist (died 1810 at sea)
 4 September – Mary FitzMaurice, 4th Countess of Orkney, née O'Brien (died 1831)
 October – George Galloway, poet and playwright
 November – John Dunlop, merchant and songwriter (died 1820)

Deaths 
 5 June – John Sinclair, Lord Murkle, judge
 4 October – Sir John Clerk, 2nd Baronet, politician, lawyer, judge and composer (born 1676)

The arts
 25 February – 11-year-old David Allan begins to study painting at the new Foulis Academy in Glasgow.
 David Dalrymple, as editor, publishes Edom of Gordon: an ancient Scottish poem.

See also 

 Timeline of Scottish history

References 

 
Years of the 18th century in Scotland
Scotland
1750s in Scotland